The Phantom Foe is a 1920 American fifteen-chapter adventure film serial directed by Bertram Millhauser and starring Warner Oland. A partial print of 14 episodes is in the George Eastman House Motion Picture Collection while the 15th episode is stored in the Library of Congress. The plot involves a villainous mesmerist played by Harry Semels.

Plot
A film magazine described what happens in the first two episodes. Episode 1, Doom: Fear of an unknown menace grips Janet Dale (Hansen) as she hears the measured tread of a giant's feet. Bob Royal (Bailey), her fiance, asks who it is she fears. She explains that her father Jeremiah Dale (Goodwin) had been the unwitting cause of the death of the wife and brother of her uncle Leo Selkirk (Oland) years before by bringing about a massacre for unjustly punishing three Indians. Selkirk had sworn vengeance upon Jeremiah Dale, but years had passed and he had seemingly forgotten his oath. She had barely finished speaking when a lighting fixture fell from the ceiling, barely missing her. At her twenty-first birthday party Janet was speaking to her father when he vanishes before her eyes. Bob Royal sees a muffled figure slinking along in the shadow of the house and tries to capture him, but the figure escapes. That night Janet, unable to sleep, wanders into the library. In the ashes of the fireplace she finds three links of a gold chain and the imprint of a giant's foot. Meditating on these things she fails to hear the approach of the muffled figure, bent on attacking her. Episode 2, Disappearance of Janet Dale: The muffled figure attacks Janet, but is driven off by Bob Royal's approach. Later in the day Bob again sees the muffled figure. He grapples with the unknown person and a fight ensues with Bab being worsted when Steve Roycroft (McCutcheon), a scientific detective, and Janet arrive, causing the muffled figure to flee in an automobile. Janet finds a notebook belonging to her Uncle Leo. They return to the house and find Leo Selkirk, believed by Bob to be an enemy, and Janet's Cousin Esther (Cassavant). Leo admits ownership of the notebook and Bob believes his suspicions are being confirmed. On the following morning Janet's room is discovered empty. A note left by her says that it will be useless to try and find her. She had received a note saying that if she followed a designated man, she would be led to a place where she could find the answer to her puzzle. She is thus brought to a disreputable place and escorted to a dingy room. When she closes the door, the episode ends as she sees the muffled figure rise from a seat in the corner and advance towards her.

Cast
 Warner Oland as Uncle Leo Selkirk
 Juanita Hansen as Janet Dale
 Wallace McCutcheon Jr. as Steve Roycroft
 William Bailey as Bob Royal (credited as William Norton Bailey)
 Nina Cassavant as Esther, Janet's Cousin
 Tom Goodwin as Jeremiah Dale (credited as Thomas Goodwin)
 Harry Semels as The Phantom Foe
 Joe Cuny as Andre Renoir
 Al Franklin Thomas

Chapter titles

Doom
Disappearance of Janet Dale
Trail of the Wolf
The Open Window
The Tower Room
The Crystal Ball
Gun Fire
The Man Trap
The Mystic Summons
The Foe Unmasked
Through Prison Walls
Behind the Veil
Attack at the Inn
Confession
Retribution

See also
 List of film serials
 List of film serials by studio

References

External links

1920 films
1920 adventure films
American silent serial films
American black-and-white films
American adventure films
Pathé Exchange film serials
Films directed by Bertram Millhauser
1920s American films
Silent adventure films